Sān Huáng Pào Chuí is a Chinese martial art attributed to the Three August Ones: Fuxi, Shennong, and Gonggong.

The spread of Pào Chuí was due in part to its early association with Shaolin.
Pào Chuí was one of the earliest styles to be imported intact into the martial arts curriculum at the Shaolin Monastery.
According to legend, the Shaolin monks learned Pào Chuí from a martial artist of Mount Emei.

At a festival thrown by the Emperor Gaozu, the Shaolin monk Tanzong gave a demonstration of Pào Chuí.

Chen-style taijiquan includes a Pào Chuí routine in its curriculum.

See also
Changquan
Chen-style taijiquan
List of t'ai chi ch'uan forms
Shaolin kung fu

References

Chinese martial arts